The 1968 Colorado State Rams football team represented Colorado State University in the Western Athletic Conference (WAC) during the 1968 NCAA University Division football season. In their seventh season under head coach Mike Lude, the Rams compiled an overall record of 2–8 and a conference mark of 1–4, placing sixth in the WAC. The games against Texas Tech and Air Force counted in the conference standings even though neither of those teams was a member of the WAC.

Schedule

References

Colorado State
Colorado State Rams football seasons
Colorado State Rams football